Mephritus auricolle is a species of beetle in the family Cerambycidae. It was described by Tavakilian and Martins in 1991.

References

Elaphidiini
Beetles described in 1991